Springwood may refer to different locations:
In the United States
Springwood Estate at the Home of Franklin D. Roosevelt National Historic Site
In Australia
Springwood, New South Wales, a suburb in the Blue Mountains, west of Sydney, Australia
Springwood, Queensland, a suburb of Logan City, south of Brisbane, Australia
Electoral district of Springwood, Queensland, Australia
in the United Kingdom
Springwood, Huddersfield, West Yorkshire, England
Fictional
Springwood, Ohio, a fictional town that is home to Freddy Krueger in the Nightmare on Elm Street films
A fictional town in Alone in the Dark, 1982 film